= Black in Deep Red =

Painting by Mark Rothko

- Artist: Mark Rothko
- Year: 1957
- Medium: Oil on canvas
- Dimensions: 276.2 cm × 136.5 cm (108.7 in × 53.7 in)
- Location: Private collection

Black in Deep Red is a 1957 oil on canvas painting by Latvian American artist Mark Rothko, from 1957. It is now in a private collection after it was sold in 2000 for $3,306,000.
